The Phoney Victory: The World War II Illusion is a book by Peter Hitchens. It was published in August 2018 by I.B. Tauris. The book addresses what Hitchens regards as the national myth of the Second World War, which he believes dealt long-term damage to Britain and its position in the world.

He argues that while the allies were, indeed, fighting a radical evil, they sometimes used immoral methods, such as the allies’ carpet bombing of German civilians. He believes that Britain's entry into World War II led to its rapid decline after the war. This was because, among other things, it could not finance the war and was not prepared. As a result, it had to surrender much of its wealth and power to avoid bankruptcy. However, Hitchens does not make a universal anti-war case because he believes that this position often leaves countries unprotected and defenceless in times of war. Instead, he argues that military power and the threat of war can be necessary deterrents against war.

Reception
The book was negatively reviewed by Richard J. Evans, former Regius Professor of Modern History at the University of Cambridge, in the New Statesman. Evans described the book as being "riddled with errors" and reliant "on a handful of eccentric studies". At the Edinburgh International Book Festival, Hitchens responds to this review, "It was reviewed... by somebody who actually honestly believed it was a Eurosceptic book written to please the patriotic readers of the Mail on Sunday; any reader of it who actually gets to the end may find this to be, how shall I put it, a possibly mistaken summary."

References

2018 non-fiction books
Books by Peter Hitchens
Books about World War II
I.B. Tauris books